The New Deal Show is a 1937 Fleischer Studios animated short film starring Betty Boop.

Synopsis
Betty Boop produces a pet show in which the pets use unusual devices to assist them in their normal behavior. Some ideas copied from Betty Boop's Crazy Inventions (1933).

References

External links
 The New Deal Show on YouTube.
 

1937 films
Betty Boop cartoons
1930s American animated films
American black-and-white films
1937 animated films
Paramount Pictures short films
Fleischer Studios short films
Short films directed by Dave Fleischer